Acrossocheilus wenchowensis is a species of ray-finned fish in the genus Acrossocheilus.

References

Wenchowensis
Fish described in 1935